Summit Township is a township in Erie County, Pennsylvania, United States. The population was 7,354 at the 2020 census, up from 6,603 at the 2010 census.

Geography
The township is in central Erie County and sits on the high ground separating the streams flowing north and west into Lake Erie, part of the St. Lawrence River watershed, from those flowing south towards the Mississippi River and the Gulf of Mexico. Walnut Creek, which flows west through Millcreek and Fairview townships to Lake Erie, rises near the eastern border of the township, while LeBoeuf Creek forms less than one mile to the west, flowing south to French Creek, a tributary of the Allegheny River, and thus to the Ohio and Mississippi as well.

Demographics

As of the census of 2000, there were 5,529 people, 2,110 households, and 1,531 families residing in the township.  The population density was 231.6 people per square mile (89.4/km2).  There were 2,212 housing units at an average density of 92.6/sq mi (35.8/km2).  The racial makeup of the township was 98.25% White, 0.56% African American, 0.13% Native American, 0.24% Asian, 0.24% from other races, and 0.60% from two or more races. Hispanic or Latino of any race were 0.34% of the population.

There were 2,110 households, out of which 29.3% had children under the age of 18 living with them, 61.2% were married couples living together, 7.5% had a female householder with no husband present, and 27.4% were non-families. 21.6% of all households were made up of individuals, and 8.2% had someone living alone who was 65 years of age or older.  The average household size was 2.59 and the average family size was 3.03.

In the township the population was spread out, with 23.5% under the age of 18, 7.0% from 18 to 24, 27.0% from 25 to 44, 27.1% from 45 to 64, and 15.4% who were 65 years of age or older.  The median age was 40 years. For every 100 females there were 98.9 males.  For every 100 females age 18 and over, there were 94.3 males.

The median income for a household in the township was $41,688, and the median income for a family was $45,048. Males had a median income of $40,059 versus $22,057 for females. The per capita income for the township was $19,782.  About 4.7% of families and 6.9% of the population were below the poverty line, including 10.6% of those under age 18 and 3.1% of those age 65 or over.

Economy
Much of Erie's commercial development has occurred along Peach Street (U.S. Route 19). The township has recently seen the development of the new Presque Isle Downs and Casino, a racino owned by Eldorado Resorts, along with more than ten hotels and many highly rated restaurants. The township also has seen the construction of many new housing developments and recreational facilities. Splash Lagoon Indoor Water Park is the sixth largest water park in the United States. Family First Sports Park holds many sporting events from soccer to basketball to golf.

Emergency response
Summit township's only fire department, Perry Hi-way Hose Company, is split into two fire stations, one on each side of the township. Station 42, at 501 E. Robison Road, currently houses a full fire station that contains Two ALS ambulances, a Paramedic truck, an engine, and a ladder. Station 43, at 8281 Oliver Road (replacing former station 43 at 8270 Peach Street), less than a mile from the Erie County 911 center, holds a heavy rescue, tanker, engine, a utility truck, and a brush truck. This fire house was built in 2009 and houses members of the live-in program. Station 43 also has a large attached social hall that holds fire house events and is rented out to the public for weddings, receptions, and birthday parties. Located behind station 42 is the Erie County regional fire training grounds. The training grounds are used by all fire departments, the Erie County haz-mat team, and Erie Airport fire/rescue. Props in the training grounds include a four-story non-burn training tower, a burn facility, a dumpster fire prop, a car fire prop, flammable gas prop, semi truck haz-mat prop, and roof prop. The facility is also host to the PEMA Emergency response group who funded many additional props for use by the Pennsylvania USAR team, Pennsylvania State Police SERT team, and Northwest Search and Rescue dogs team. The props that were brought in by the ERG includes multiple dog platforms, a rubble pile, and confined space and trench simulators.

References

External links

Summit Township official website

Townships in Erie County, Pennsylvania